Signal-induced proliferation-associated 1-like protein 1 is a protein that in humans is encoded by the SIPA1L1 gene.

References

Further reading